"Sidewalking" is a song by Scottish alternative rock band the Jesus and Mary Chain. It was released as a standalone single in March 1988 and included in the compilation album Barbed Wire Kisses, released in April 1988. The single is also included on their 2002 compilation album. 21 Singles. The track reflected the band's interest in hip hop and samples the drumbeat from the 1984 single "Roxanne's Revenge" by Roxanne Shante as a loop. "Sidewalking" reached number 30 on the UK Singles Chart, number 20 in Ireland, and number 23 in New Zealand.

Track listings
All tracks were written by Jim Reid and William Reid.

7-inch single (NEG 32)
 "Sidewalking"
 "Taste of Cindy" (recorded live in Detroit)

12-inch single (NEG 32T)
 "Sidewalking" (extended version)
 "Sidewalking" (7-inch mix)
 "Taste of Cindy" (recorded live in Detroit)
 "April Skies" (recorded live in Detroit)

UK mini-CD single (NEG32 CD)
 "Sidewalking" – 3:33
 "Sidewalking" (extended version) – 7:50 
 "Taste of Cindy" (recorded live in Detroit) – 1:40
 "Sidewalking" (Chilled to the Bone) – 3:34

Personnel
The Jesus and Mary Chain
 Jim Reid – vocals, guitar, producer
 William Reid – guitar, producer

Additional personnel
 John Loder – producer
 Westwood One – engineer (live tracks)
 Helen Backhouse – design
 Andrew Catlin – photography

Charts

References

The Jesus and Mary Chain songs
1988 singles
1988 songs
Blanco y Negro Records singles
Songs written by Jim Reid
Songs written by William Reid (musician)